Vattenfall Europe Nuclear Energy GmbH is a subsidiary of the Swedish power company Vattenfall that has majority and minority ownerships of three nuclear power plants around Hamburg in Germany. It is located in Überseering 12, 22297 Hamburg.

 Brunsbüttel Nuclear Power Plant (66,7% Vattenfall Europe Nuclear Energy GmbH, 33,3% E.ON), taken out of service in 2007.
 Krümmel Nuclear Power Plant (50% Vattenfall Europe Nuclear Energy GmbH, 50% E.ON), reactor not in service since 4 July 2009.
 Brokdorf Nuclear Power Plant (20% Vattenfall Europe Nuclear Energy GmbH, 80% E.ON)

See also

 E.ON Kernkraft GmbH

References

External links
 http://www.vattenfall.de/de/vattenfall-europe-nuclear-energy.htm

Vattenfall
Nuclear power companies of Germany